WestRock is an American corrugated packaging company. It was formed in July 2015 after the merger of MeadWestvaco and RockTenn. WestRock is the 2nd largest American packaging company. It is one of the world's largest paper and packaging companies with 21.3 billion in annual revenue and more than 50,000 team members in more than 300 locations in 30 countries around the world. The company is headquartered in Sandy Springs, Georgia, consolidating offices from Norcross, Georgia and Richmond, Virginia.

History and acquisitions 
Westrock was formed in May 2015 after the merger of MeadWestvaco and Rock Tenn. MeadWestvaco stockholders received 0.78 shares of the combined company. Rock-Tenn stockholders chose either one share of the combined company or a specific cash amount for each of their shares.

In October 2015, WestRock purchased SP Fiber Holdings, Inc. The company manufactures recycled container board as well as kraft and bag paper. In January 2016, the company acquired Cenveo Packaging for $105 million which manufactures folded cartons and litho-laminated display packaging like MiraFoil, coil foil, and low migration ink systems. The sale included facilities located in the United States, Canada, and Dominican Republic.

In March 2017 WestRock purchased Star Pizza box, largest US manufacturer and distributor of pizza boxes.

In April 2017, WestRock completed the sale of its dispensing systems operations for $1.025 billion to Silgan Holdings.

In June 2017, the company acquired Multi Packaging Solutions International (MPS) for an enterprise value of $2.28 billion. MPS has 59 locations across North America, Europe, and Asia and will enhance Westrock's print, graphics, and design capabilities for more penetration in spirits, confectionery, beauty and cosmetics packaging.

In January 2018, the company acquired Plymouth Packaging, Inc. Later that month, WestRock announced that it would acquire rival pulp and paper company Kapstone. The deal is expected to close by the end of the third quarter of 2018.
The company ranked 194th on the 2018 Fortune 500 of the largest United States corporations by revenue.

References

External links
 Official website

Pulp and paper companies of the United States
Companies based in Richmond, Virginia
Companies listed on the New York Stock Exchange
American companies established in 2015
Manufacturing companies established in 2015
2015 establishments in Virginia
Packaging companies of the United States
Manufacturing companies based in Georgia (U.S. state)